Bay Street Beach Historic District (also known as the Inkwell) is an historic beach in Los Angeles County.

History 
The beach was a place of recreation and leisure, by African Americans, during the Jim Crow era. The beach was located at Pico Boulevard and two city blocks south to Bicknell Street, near Phillips Chapel Christian Methodist Episcopal Church .

In 1922, the Santa Monica Bay Protective League was organized to attempt to fence the beach to exclude African Americans.

In 1927, the National Association for the Advancement of Colored People  challenged restrictive covenants at Manhattan Beach, south of Santa Monica, which were overturned by the Supreme Court of California .

Alison Rose Jefferson and Michael Blum, documented the historic value of the district. In 2008, the Santa Monica officially recognized the district.

References 

Beaches of Los Angeles County, California